Chrysso albomaculata is a species of spider found in the United States and the Caribbean to Brazil.

References

Theridiidae
Spiders described in 1882
Pantropical spiders